The Bachelor of Clinical Medical Practice (BCMP) is a three-year degree awarded to clinical associates by universities in South Africa.

It is shorter than the Bachelor of Clinical Medicine and Community Health degree awarded to clinical officers in east Africa but similar to the three-year diploma.

Medical degrees